The 2008 Asian Women's Handball Championship was the twelfth Asian Championship, which was taking place from 21 to 30 November 2008 in Bangkok, Thailand. It acted as the Asian qualifying tournament for the 2009 World Women's Handball Championship in China.

Draw

Preliminary round
All times are local (UTC+7).

Group A

Group B

Placement 5th–10th

9th/10th

7th/8th

5th/6th

Final round

Semifinals

Bronze medal match

Gold medal match

Final standing

References
Japan Handball Federation (Archived 5 September 2009)
Results (Archived 5 September 2009)
www.asianhandball.com

Asian women championship
H
International handball competitions hosted by Thailand
Asian Handball Championships
November 2008 sports events in Asia